The sanhu proper (Chinese: 三胡; pinyin: sānhú) is a Chinese bowed musical instrument with three strings.  It was developed in the 1970s and is essentially a three-stringed version of the two-stringed erhu, with an additional bass string.

The Yi people of the Yunnan province of southwest China play a large three-stringed traditional bowed instrument (Yizu sanhu, sanhu of Yi) that is also referred to as the sanhuphoto, which was developed in early Qing Dynasty from Xiqin.

See also
 Chinese music
 List of Chinese musical instruments
 Huqin

External links
Dagongmaosanhu page
Sanhu page
Article about Yi sanhu

Video
Sanhu video

Huqin family instruments
Bowed instruments
Chinese musical instruments